Blewer Farm is a historic home and farm complex located at Newark Valley in Tioga County, New York. The -story, cross-gabled frame house was constructed between 1885 and 1900 in the Queen Anne style.  Also on the property are a tenant house, workshop, dairy barn, livestock shed, former privy, two silos, and two modern sheds.  Most of the buildings were built between the late 19th or mid-20th century. The main house is currently in disrepair.

It was listed on the National Register of Historic Places in 1998.

References

Houses on the National Register of Historic Places in New York (state)
Queen Anne architecture in New York (state)
Houses in Tioga County, New York
National Register of Historic Places in Tioga County, New York